Jericho Mansions is a 2003 independent mystery thriller film directed by Alberto Sciamma. It stars Jennifer Tilly, James Caan, Geneviève Bujold, and Maribel Verdú. It was filmed in Saint John, New Brunswick and in Almería, Spain.

External links

2003 films
Films set in the United States
Films shot in New Brunswick
Films shot in Almería
2000s English-language films
Films directed by Alberto Sciamma